Oridryas is a genus of moths of the family Yponomeutidae.

Species
Oridryas angarensis - Caradja, 1939 
Oridryas isalopex - Meyrick, 1938 
Oridryas mienshanensis - Caradja, 1939 

Yponomeutidae